Finkenbach is a river of Lower Saxony, Germany. It is a right tributary of the Hombach. It flows in the area of Bassum.

See also
List of rivers of Lower Saxony

Rivers of Lower Saxony
Rivers of Germany